Sunshine of Your Love is a 1969 live album by Ella Fitzgerald. Recorded at the Venetian Room, The Fairmont San Francisco, in October 1968. The main body of works performed here are
contemporary pop songs from the late 1960s. Originally released on the German found jazz label MPS Records the album was re-issued on CD, with alternative artwork, in 1996 by Verve Records.

Track listing
For the 1969 LP on MPS Records; MPS 15010; Re-issued by PolyGram-Verve in 1996 on CD, Verve 314 533 102-2

Side One:
 "Hey Jude" (John Lennon, Paul McCartney) – 3:54
 "Sunshine of Your Love" (Pete Brown, Jack Bruce, Eric Clapton) – 3:21
 "This Girl's in Love With You" (Burt Bacharach, Hal David) – 4:30
 "Watch What Happens" (Norman Gimbel, Michel Legrand) – 4:00
 "Alright, Okay, You Win" (Mayme Watts, Sidney Wyche) – 3:51
 "Give Me the Simple Life" (Rube Bloom, Harry Ruby) – 2:05
Side Two:
 "Inútil Paisagem" ("Useless Landscape") (Antonio Carlos Jobim, Ray Gilbert, Aloysio Oliveira) – 5:13
 "Old Devil Moon" (Yip Harburg, Burton Lane) – 4:21
 "Don'cha Go 'Way Mad" (Illinois Jacquet, Jimmy Mundy, Al Stillman) – 3:37
 "A House Is Not a Home" (Bacharach, David) – 4:14
 "Trouble Is a Man" (Alec Wilder) – 4:14
 "Love You Madly" (Duke Ellington) – 3:04

Personnel
Tracks 1-6 Ernie Hecksher's Big Band

Track 7-12 Tommy Flanagan Trio

 Ella Fitzgerald – vocals
 Tommy Flanagan – piano, conductor
 Frank DeLaRosa – double bass
 Ed Thigpen – drums
 Frank De Vol – arranger, conductor
 Ernie Heckscher - conductor 
 Allen Smith (tracks 1-6) - trumpet
 Wally Heider – engineer

References

Ella Fitzgerald live albums
Albums produced by Norman Granz
1969 live albums
MPS Records live albums
Albums conducted by Frank De Vol
Albums arranged by Frank De Vol
Albums conducted by Tommy Flanagan
Verve Records live albums
PolyGram live albums